The term Lees can refer to:

Companies and organisations
 Lees of Scotland, confectionery maker
 Laboratory for Electromagnetic and Electronic Systems (LEES), Massachusetts Institute of Technology (MIT)
 J.W. Lees Brewery, a brewery in Middleton, Greater Manchester, England

Places
 Lees, Derbyshire, a village in England
 Lees, Greater Manchester, village near Oldham in North West England
 Lees River in Massachusetts, United States
 Lees Station, Tennessee, a community in the U.S. state of Tennessee

Transportation
 Lees railway station, closed railway station in Lancashire, England
 Lees station, light rail station in Ottawa, Ontario, Canada

Others
 Lees (fermentation), dead yeast and debris left after fermentation of wine, beer, etc.
 Lees (surname)

See also

 Lee's (disambiguation)
 Leese (disambiguation)
 Lee (disambiguation)
 Lease
 Leece